Rhysodromus mysticus is a species of running crab spider in the family Philodromidae. It is found in Russia, the United States, and Canada.

References

Philodromidae
Spiders described in 1975